St. Mary's Orthodox Syrian Church, Kottayam, commonly known as Kottayam Cheriapally, is a Malankara Orthodox Syrian Church located in Kottayam, Kerala, India. Cheriapally meaning ‘small church’, whose appearance contradicts its name, is one of the oldest and well-preserved churches in the state.
Cheriapally is located on the way to Kumarakom from Kottayam. The church is dedicated to mother Mary. Kottayam Cheriapally, built in 1579, has retained its old world charm today as well even after so much of environmental changes. The length and breadth of the church is constructed with innovative paintings, mural, and architecture. Before the inception of the Old Seminary in 1815, Kottayam Cheriapally was the Headquarters of the Church and Malankara Metropolitans for a long time.

History 
Many stories and legends regarding the establishment and evolution of Christianity in Central Travancore surrounds this church. The legend is that the Thekkumkore (old Kottayam) kings were glad that Christians were living in their kingdom, as they were committed towards working hard to earn a living, and thus had taken the entire responsibility of their security. King Kothavarma, who was ruling the kingdom during that period, provided them land for constructing the church, without levying tax. A church was first built in 1550 and named Valiyapally. However, the congregation later split on ethnic lines and the dissidents built Cheriapally in 1579. It is said that two worship places were not permitted in a single village and thus the king had to divide the village into two so that both the churches could exist. The church was built by Portuguese architect Antony and his team along with the craftsmen of the Thekkumkore Kingdom (old Kottayam) in 1579. However, the Portuguese had no influence on the mode of worship in the church. It is typically dedicated to Syrian Christians. While visiting Cheriapally, one may feel that the architecture greatly resembles that of some temples in Kerala. However, the fact is that during those days, the mode of building every place of worship was the same, irrespective of it being a temple or a church. Kottayam's iconic Cheriapally Mahaedavaka is an architectural marvel and a repository of legends.

Holy Girdle of St. Mary 
Kottayam Cheriapally has the unique distinction of being the first church in India to get the Relics of St. Mary (a small part of the Holy girdle of St. Mary) installed at the church. This relic is also known as the Soonoro or Holy belt of St. Mary. The Holy girdle was presented by Ignatius Yacub III, the Patriarch of Antioch to Baselios Augen I, the then Catholicos & Malankara Metropolitan who ceremoniously installed it at Kottayam Cheriapally on 16 January 1966. The holy girdle is kept in the church and is taken out for public viewing from 10 August to 15 August every year during the 15 days fast to commemorate the translation of St. Mary.

Kottayam Cheriapally - A treasure trove of mural art 
Built in the Portuguese-Baroque-Keralite style, the mural art on the church interiors depicts the major incidents in Jesus Christ's life. The eastern side of the church wall portrays the major happenings in the life of the Lord's mother. Some of the paintings depict the trial of Christ, Crucifixion, and Christ being taken down from the cross.
The ceiling with 99 tiles is adorned with various paintings. Historians said that these were painted by foreign artists. Interestingly, the clothes worn by the people in the paintings are also European in style. Thought the paintings are in European style, some experts claim the technique used is that of artists from Kerala. All the paintings have been created by only using organic dyes from vegetables and flowers. The red colour seen in the paintings are drawn using Red brick. People from different countries visit the church to study these paintings. Several of the wall paintings had faded with the passage of time. The centuries-old mural paintings have been restored to their former glory by mural painting artist V.M. Jiju Lal and team after a hard work for three months. The rare paintings, which are believed to be more than 300 years old, at the holy sanctuary (madhaba) of the church were brought back without losing on their aesthetic quality. The consecration of the holy sanctuary (madhaba) after mural painting restoration was done on January 11, 2020.

Architecture 
The church exhibits a blend of Kerala and Portuguese styles of architecture. Its European architectural style galleries, large granite pillars, cornices and pediments make it an attractive building. The roof of the portico is supported by ten granite pillars and has a large lotus carved out of single piece of granite. Even the baptism basin inside the church has been chiseled from a single stone. Anappalla (elephant belly) style compound wall, characteristic of ancient temples in Kerala is another attraction in Kottayam Cheriapally. The walls around the church are over one meter thick and are strongly influenced by Hindu temple architecture. The niches in the walls accommodate hundreds of oil lamps. With its unique features and the exciting tales surrounding it, Kottayam Cheriapally is a must-visit for those inclined towards traditional buildings and architecture.

Metropolitans from Kottayam Cheriapally 

Geevargis Mar Dionysius III (1785 - May 19, 1825), also known as Punnathra Mar Dionysius, the 11th Malankara Metropolitan, Dr. Philipose Mar Theophilose (May 9, 1911 - September 28, 1997) a man of definite vision, mission and commitment, also known as the Ambassador of Malankara Church and Yuhanon Mar Athanasios (March 21, 1928 - October 12, 1980) also known as Abo Yuhanon are the proud sons of Kottayam Cheriapally.

Geevargis Mar Dionysius III, also known as Punnathra Mar Dionysius was born as Kurien in 1785 in the well known Punnathra family, Kottayam. Soon after his ordination as a priest, Kurien Kathanar was appointed at Kallumkathra Church. It was his suggestion during the time of Mar Thoma IX to establish the Syrian seminary at Kottayam, Kerala's first educational institution. In 1816, following the demise of Mar Dionysius II (Pulikottil Joseph Mar Dionysius), Punnathra Kurien Ramban was elected to succeed him as the Malankara Metropolitan by the general assembly of the Church (Malankara palli-yogam) and was ordained as Bishop on October 19, 1817. Punnathra Mar Dionysious was the 11th Malankara Metropolitan of the church.
During the time of Punnathara Mar Dionysious, the relation with Travancore and Cochin was very cordial. The Ruler of Travancore Rani Gouri Parvathi Bhai, gave a number of privileges to the Seminary. For the first time in Travancore in 1818, Maha Rani appointed a number of Christians as Judges. He encouraged Anglican Missionary Benjamin Bailey to translate the Bible and helped Norton to spread the Word. He also welcomed some of the first missionary teachers who arrived from England to teach in the seminary at Kottayam. Punnathra Mar Dionysius died on May 19, 1825, and was interred at Kottayam Cheriapally.

Dr. Philipose Mar Theophilose was born on May 9, 1911, in Kallupurakkal family, Puthanangadi, Kottayam. He completed B.A degree from Maharaja's College, Cochin. He studied M.A in St.Augustine of Canterbury, England, T.H.M in Cardiff University, UK, and D.D from Harward University in Chicago, USA. He became a deacon in 1929 and anointed as a priest in 1944. He was long time vicar of Kottayam Cheriappally. He started two schools: St. Thomas school in Puthenagadi and St. John's High school Ellikkal under the auspices of Kottayam Chriapally and also acquired other properties for the church.
Being consecrated as Metropolitan on August 24, 1966, Mar Theophilos served Angamaly and Bombay dioceses. He was the Principal of the Orthodox Theological Seminary, Kottayam (Old Seminary) and was the architect of the revamped Seminary. Mar Theophilos' 30 years term as the President of the Mar Gregorios Orthodox Christian Students Movement (MGOCSM) is known as the Golden Period of the organisation.
Mar Theophilos was known as the Ambassador of the Malankara Orthodox Church during his lifetime. He was the founder member of the World Christian Council (WCC). He worked as Secretary of Faith and Order division and central committee member of the WCC. Mar Theophilos was highly honoured by Eastern Orthodox churches. He was the only one special invitee to attend the selection of Peeman Patriarch of Russian Orthodox Church. He was given a grand honor when he was invited to attend the Republic day parade of Romania as chief guest along with Romanian President and Romanian Patriarch. Mar Theophilos died on September 28, 1997, and was entombed in Thrikunnath Seminary, Aluva in Kerala.

Yuhanon Mar Athanasios also known as Abo Yuhanon was born on March 21, 1928, in Chakkalaparampil family, Puthenangadi, Kottayam and was called as Mani (C.V. Mani). He completed his studies at CMS school Chalukunnu, Kottayam and CMS college, Kottayam. After his academic education, he worked as a tutor in St: Thomas College, Pala. Later he resigned the job and there after joined Bethany Asram at Perunad, Ranni on May 21, 1953. He was ordained as Deacon on June 15, 1956, by Baselius Geevarghese II and on the very next day Geevarghese himself ordained Dn. Yuhanon as Fr. Yuhanon at Orthodox Theological Seminary Kottayam. He later served as superior of Bethany Asram. He was known as a great retreat father of his times. Baselios Marthoma Mathews 1 Catholicos consecrated him as Youhanon Mar Athanasios at Pazhanji Church on May 15, 1978, along with four others. Mar Athanasios was the youngest of all the bishops at that time. He became the assistant Metropolitan of Kottayam diocese. Mar Athanasios entered his eternal abode on October 12, 1980, and was laid to rest at Bethany Asram.

Church feast 
The Dormition of Mother Mary or holy Theotokos occupies the most important place in the Orthodox Church next to that of Jesus Christ. It is indeed a great feast which depicts ‘falling asleep’ of the Mother of God and taking her body up into heaven by angels. The Feast of the Dormition of St. Mary (Vaangippu Perunnal or Shoonoyo Perunnal) is observed in this church on August 15. The feast of Dormition is celebrated by two weeks of fasting, known as the Dormition fast, beginning from 1 August to 15 August which draws many people from far and wide.
The annual feast of the church (Feast of St. Mary) falls on January 15 and is known as Vithukalude Perunnal which means ‘the festival of seeds’. It is observed to invoke the blessings of Virgin Mary upon the agricultural seeds.

See also
 Malankara Orthodox Syrian Church

References

External links

 St. Mary's Orthodox Syrian Church.

Religious buildings and structures completed in 1579
16th-century Eastern Orthodox church buildings
Churches in Kottayam district
1579 establishments in India
Soonoro churches in Kerala